Solar power in Mexico has the potential to produce vast amounts of energy. 70% of the country has an insolation of greater than 4.5 kWh/m2/day. Using 15% efficient photovoltaics, a square  on each side in the state of Chihuahua or the Sonoran Desert (0.01% of Mexico) could supply all of Mexico's electricity.

History 

A law requiring 35% of electricity from renewable resources by 2024 and carbon emission reductions of 50% below 2000 levels by 2050 was introduced in 2012. 
Combined with declining solar installation costs, it was estimated that the 2012 climate law would lead to 6 GW of solar capacity in Mexico by 2020. 
At the Solar Power Mexico conference, it was said that PV electricity and solar thermal would comprise up to 5% of Mexico's energy by 2030 and up to 10% by 2050.
The first long term energy auction was held in 2015 with a second one in 2016. Solar PV was successful in both, securing 1,691 MW of the 2,085 MW auctioned in the first and 1573 MW of 3473 MW in the second auction.

In 2013, 22% of the installed electricity generation capacity in Mexico was from renewable sources. 
The majority, 18.1% coming from hydroelectricity, 2.5% from wind power and 0.1% from solar PV. 
In December 2013, the Mexican government passed a Constitutional Reform that effectively opened the energy sector to private investment, both for electricity generation and petroleum exploration and extraction. 
The Reform's goal was to modernize the sector by optimizing the use of national resources and incentivizing renewable energy through clean energy certificates. 
The Reform liberalized the electricity sector and brought forth a wholesale electricity market. 
Long and medium term auctions are the main mechanisms used to incentivize capacity and energy growth. Clean energy certificates are created by the participation of renewables and are meant to support energy generated from low carbon emitting sources. A long term energy action secures a 15-year contract for energy and capacity supplied whereas medium term generates a 3-year contract.

Mexico was the second largest solar generator in Latin America in 2016, with 180 MW installed capacity and more than 500 MW under construction. 
At a clean source auction that year, solar won 1,860 MW at an average price of $50.7 per MWh (ranging between $35 and $67). 
The production was expected to be 4 TWh per year. 
Other sources such as gas, hydro and geothermal received no awards, and wind power won a smaller share than solar.

As of 2017, thanks to the Long-Term Energy Auctions, solar PV energy is expected to increase to 6% in 2018 and 13% for 2019.

Production
Historically, the main applications of solar energy technologies in Mexico have been for non-electric active solar system applications for space heating, water heating and drying crops. As in most countries, wind power development preceded solar power initially, due to the lower installation cost. Since solar power is not available during the night, and because wind power tends to be complementary to solar, a mix of both can be expected. Both require substantial storage to compensate for days with no wind and no sun. Batteries provide short-term storage, and pumped hydroelectricity provides longer-term storage.

Projects
The Villanueva Solar plant is the largest in Mexico with 310 MW installed by mid-2018. When completed, it will be the largest in the Americas at 828 MW.

Another large installation, Don José Solar Farm was completed in May 2018 Initially at 238 MW, a 22 MW expansion project was immediately announced.

A 405 MWp (megawatt-peak) photovoltaic project in Puerto Libertad, Sonora was completed in December, 2018. 
Originally planned to be 39 MW, the size was increased to allow generation of approximately 963 GWh (gigawatt-hours) of electricity per year.

A solar trough based 14 MW plant will use a combined cycle gas turbine of 478 MW to provide electricity to the city of Agua Prieta, Sonora. The World Bank has financed this project with US$50 million. A 450 MW concentrated photovoltaics plant is planned for Baja California.

Distributed Generation
Currently, 98% of all distributed generation can be attributed to solar PV panels installed on rooftops or small businesses. This installed capacity has greatly increased from 3 kW in 2007 to 247.6 MW by the end of 2016. According to the Mexican Ministry of Energy (SENER) if this trend continues till 2018 the total installed capacity will surpass 527 MW, this is the goal set by the Mexico's Special Program for Energy Transition or PETE (Programa Especial de la Transición Energética)

Distributed energy in Mexico is classified as any system with a capacity below 500 kW. The National Association of Solar Energy (ANES from the Spanish acronym) reported approximately 21,600 interconnection permits for distributed solar in 2015. In March, 2017 the Energy Regulatory Commission (CRE) approved regulation that allows net metering for distributed energy generation.

Solar potential

Installed capacity

(*) This forecast does not account for economic impacts of the COVID-19 pandemic.

See also

Renewable energy in Mexico
Wind power in Mexico
Solar power
Feed-in tariff
Renewable energy
Growth of photovoltaics
Renewable energy by country

References

External links

Solar Power Mexico 2013
Sonora Energy Group